Late Nite is the first solo album by Neal Schon released in 1989. Bob Marlette played keyboards and produced the album. Several of the musicians were former Journey members Gregg Rolie, Jonathan Cain, Steve Smith, and Randy Jackson as well as future Journey members Deen Castronovo and Omar Hakim.

Critical reception 

In review of 24 June 1989 David Spodek of RPM, admitted that album showcases Schon's talent but the overall effect could be mixed. He wrote: "This sounds like nothing more than another Journey record, and may end up fading away fast with only die-hard Journey fans providing it with any support at retail."

Track listing
 "Le Dome" (instrumental*) (Schon, Marlette) - 1:07
 "Late Nite" (instrumental) (Schon, Marlette) - 6:37
 "Softly" (Schon, Marlette, Rolie, Burtnick) - 5:19
 "The Theme" (instrumental*)  (Schon, Marlette) - 9:41
 "I'll Be Waiting" (instrumental*) (Schon, Marlette, Rolie) - 5:05
 "I'll Cover You" (Schon, Burtnick, Marlette) - 5:56
 "Rain's Comin' Down" (Schon, Cain, Marlette) - 7:06
 "Smoke of the Revolution" (Schon, Cain, Spiro) - 4:45
 "Inner Circles" (instrumental) (Schon, Marlette) - 4:38
 "Steps" (instrumental) (Schon, Marlette) - 5:32
 "Blackened Bacon" (Schon, Marlette, Newman) - 2:28

*except for background vocals.

Personnel
 Neal Schon – guitars, lead vocals, mandolin on "Blackened Bacon"
 Bob Marlette – keyboards
 Randy Jackson – bass guitar
 Steve Smith – drums (3,4,5,7), percussion (11)
 Omar Hakim – drums (2,6,7,11)
 Pastiche – background vocals on "Le Dome", "I'll Be Waiting", "I'll Cover You", "Rain's Comin' Down"
 Sheryl Crow – background vocals on "Smoke of the Revolution"
 Jonathan Cain – keyboards on "Smoke of the Revolution"
 Deen Castronovo – drums on "Smoke of the Revolution"

Production
 Bob Marlette  – producer
 Gary Wagner – producer of "Smoke of the Revolution"
 Bob Ludwig – mastering
 Tom Size – assistant engineer

References

Sources
 Liner notes from the album.

1989 debut albums
Neal Schon albums
Jazz fusion albums by American artists
Columbia Records albums